The Women's alpine combined competition at the 2017 World Championships was held on 10 February.

Results
The downhill race was started at 10:00 and the slalom race at 13:00.

Between runs, Lara Gut injured her left knee (ACL, meniscus), which ended her season.

References

Women's super combined
2017 in Swiss women's sport
FIS